St George's Syro-Malabar Forane Church is a Catholic pilgrimage church in Kulathuvayal, Perambra, Kozhikode, India.

History
During the large-scale migration in the 1920s and 1930s from central Travancore, the whole of Malabar was under the Latin diocese of Kozhikode. The administrators of the diocese paid special attention to the spiritual needs of the new settlers and gave them all the necessary help. The nearest Catholic Church in those days was at Vadakara. As new Christian settlements were established, the missionaries of Kozhikode diocese started paying attention to the needs of the community. The first among those who came to Kulathuvayal had been Fr. Siaro, Fr. Rebello, and Fr. Joseph Peediekkal. It was Fr. Siaro who celebrated the first holy mass at Kulathuvayal. That had been in the house of Mathur Cherian, one of the earliest settlers of the area.

The bishop of Kozhikode, Leo Presarpio SJ, understood the problems of the settlers and did everything to help them. In 1941, he authorized Fr. Joseph Peediekkal, the vicar of Vadakara church, to manage the spiritual needs of the people of Kulathuvayal, Maruthonkara and Padathukadavu, which were part of the Perambra settlement area.

Every Sunday Fr. Peediekkal celebrated the holy mass for the settler community at Kulathuvayal, in the house of Chacko Njallimakkal.

The church, named after St. George, was established in 1941 under the initiative of Fr. Peediekkal. Janab Moythu Sahib donated  of prime land at Kulathuvayal hill top for the new church. The thatched shed for the new church was constructed under the leadership of Fathers Peediekkal, Mathew Kappukattil, and John Makkil. Taking a contribution of 25 paise each during prayer meetings had accumulated the necessary money. The cemetery was also established near the church by Fr. Peediekkal in 1941.

In 1943 the church building was reconstructed. It was a strong edifice built on granite pillars and was given a tiled roof. The new building was constructed literally on the strength of the gold ornaments of about 25 families. They were mostly the humble offerings of the poor mothers who were struggling in the midst of dangerous fevers and acute scarcity. Very soon Rev. Presarpio appointed Fr. DeCosta to assist Fr. Peediekkal. He used to come to Kulathuvayal on Saturday, say the mass on Sunday and then return to Kozhikode. On 28 January 1944, the bishop came to Padathukadavu and then to Kulathuvayal through Palery. The road to Kulathuvayal from Padathukadavu was built, led by Janab Moythu who contributed food for the workers. Utilizing the 6000 rupees he contributed, a new car was bought from Coimbatore by Professor K. M. Chandy (former governor of Gujarat), and the bishop was taken to Kulathuvayal in that along the new road. He promised the crowd at the top of Kulathuvayal hill that he would soon give them a new permanent vicar. Fr. Thomas Ayilloor, of Thampalakkad, was appointed as the first vicar of Kulathuvayal on 25 April 1944.

Those were the days when forest fevers had their heyday, tormenting the settler community continuously. On some days there had been as many as thirteen funerals on a single day at Kulathuvayal church cemetery. In distant places graves were formed under trees and shrubs. Fr. Ayilloor went from house to house; the Koyna tablets he carried in his pockets saved the lives of hundreds.

Rev. Fr. Ayilloor established several churches for the Christian settlers, at Peruvannamoozhy, Koorachundu, Kallanode, Thalayad, and Kattippara. He also contributed to education; he started St George LP School Kulathuvayal, St Antony's LP School Chakkittapara, St Thomas LP School Koorachundu, St Mary's LP School Kallanodu.

The Chakkittappara Lower Primary School which Fr. Ayilloor established had a long and eventful history. Avadukka Lower Primary School had been the oldest school of the area. The manager of that school, Kelothu Kunjiramakurup shifted the school to Chakkittappara in June 1944. Fr. Ayilloor bought that school and renovated it giving it the new name of St Antony's LP School. Today the school is functioning in the land which was donated by Panamattathil Outha. The Kayanna Post Office was established mainly because of him. He also provided legal advice. In 1949, Fr. Ayilloor was transferred to Manathavady, and was succeeded as the vicar of Kulathuvayal by Fr. L.H Miranda from Mangalapuram, a doctor of homoeopathy. During his service  the Chembra-Perambra road was opened. He was transferred to Thalasserry in 1951.

Msgr. C. J. Varkey Kuzhikulam became vicar of Kulathuvayal. During his sixteen-year incumbency several construction works were carried out in Kulathuvayal, including the church and the school. The new church building was consecrated five years after the laying of the foundation stone, in the silver jubilee year of the parish. The church building he constructed was peculiar with its balcony, priest home, and the eighty feet tall tower.

The elementary school had to be shifted from where it stood when the new church was constructed. The school became a high school on 28 June 1954. Fr. Varkey was responsible for setting up St. George's High School Kulathuvayal, Pushpa L P School, Narimada, and St. Joseph's Lower Primary School, Oonjil.

The only swimming pool associated with a school in north Kerala is at Kulathuvayal, due to Mgr. Varkey;  he was a great sportsman. He bought a volleyball net and ball for Chakkittappara; annual volleyball tournaments are conducted for a rolling trophy in his name.

Fr. Varkey also encouraged and sponsored enterprises. He was behind the Oorakkuzhy waterfall becoming the source of the Kuttiady hydroelectric project that later became the lighthouse of Malabar. Fr. Varkey and Thomas Madukkavumkal photographed the waterfall; the photographs were incorporated in the report Mr. Thomas published in Mathrubhumy. The government initiated the plans about the Kuttiady project after the publication of that report.

The Sacred Heart convent on the eastern side of the Kulathuvayal hill was established mainly because of the attempt of Mgr. Varkey. He also established the Vimala Mary Congregation, which later became MSMI, which now has more than fifty branches in different places.

Mount St. George Hospital and the Georgian Institute of Commerce also benefitted from Mgr. Varkey's attention. Although they no longer exist, they served an essential purpose in their time; they disappeared only after fulfilling their goals.

In 1953, when Thalasserry diocese was established, Mgr. Varkey continued to serve Kulathuvayal. He helped the bishop, Mar Sebastian Velloppilly, to establish the Corporate Management for the schools that came under the diocese. Fr. Varkey later left to become the corporate manager of the Thalasserry diocese. Later he returned to Kulathuvayal as the director of Vimalalayam.

The initial hardships of the settlers had almost come to an end. In 1967–69, Fr. Francis Aarupara led the parish. Fr. Mathew Kottukappally was the next vicar, and he remained in charge until 1974. It was during his tenure that Kulathuvayal and Chakkittappara became electrified. The construction of the first floor of the high school including the office, and the widening of the Perambra-Koorachundu road were the major developmental activities undertaken under his leadership.

The next vicar was Fr. Kuriakose Chemblany, who remained until 1978. Fr. Mathew Panachippuram was the vicar until 1981 and Fr. Joseph Koottarappally occupied the position till 1984. Mgr. Sebastian Kanjirakkattukunnel was the vicar from 1984 to 1989 and Fr. Thomas Kochuparampil was the vicar for a short period from 1989 to 1990. During the tenure of Rev. Fr. Chemblany new rooms were built for the high school, near the ground. The silver jubilee celebrations of the school were organized under the initiative of Fr. Panachippuram, and a new hall was built as the jubilee memorial. The water supply scheme for the school was also established in that period.

The growth of the parish continued during the tenure of Fathers Koottarappally and  Kanjirakkattukunnel. Both showed much interest in the development of the agricultural activities of the parish. The present Karikandanpara chapel building was built under the leadership of Fr. Koottarappally. In his time the compound wall was built around the church, and the main gate was placed. A migration memorial at Chembra was built on his initiative.

Fr. Thomas Kochuparampil only served for one year, and was succeeded by. Fr. Jacob Puthenpura. He led the golden jubilee celebrations of the parish. He was followed by Fr. Joseph Arakaparambil, who served for six years. During his tenure the foundation of a Higher Secondary School was laid. Fr. Francis  Kallikattu came after him, and completed the construction of St. George's Higher Secondary School Kulathuvayal. It currently holds students in Science, Commerce and Arts scheme. He constructed a compound wall around the church, built a new staircase that would take to the front portion of the church, and did maintenance work on the church. He also laid the foundation of a renewed cemetery. Mgr. Mathew Choorapoykayil came after him and completed  work at the cemetery. It was blessed by Mar Paul Chitilapally, the bishop of Thamarashery, in the year 2008. Fr. George Karukamalil became the vicar and manager of both the school and the higher secondary. Fr. George Karukamalil helped for the formation of new Parish at Narinada which was named after the first saint of India St. Alphonsa.

Kulathuvayal was declared as the one and only Official Pilgrim Centre in Syro-Malabar by Cardinal Mar George Alanchery on 28 April 2012. The Church was designated as the Shrine of St George and the Vicar came to be known as the Rector. The Madbaha inside the Church was renovated and made a vast parking area beyond the compound wall of the church by Fr. George Karukamalil as a preparation for upgrading the parish as the Pilgrim Centre. He started renovating the high school building. In 2013 Fr. Vinoy Purayidom took charge as the Rector of the Shrine of St George. He continued renovated the high school building. In May 2015 when Fr. Vinoy Purayidom was appointed as the Corporate Manager of the Educational Institutions in Thamarassery Diocese, Fr. Saji Chakkittamuri came to Kulathuvayal as its Captain. The rosary village and way of the cross was constructed under his leadership. He renovated the high school building first Kulathuvayal had been part of the Kozhikode diocese. It became a part of the Thalasserry diocese from its inception. The first bishop of the new diocese was Mar Sebastian Velloppilly. In 1986, when Thamarasserry diocese was formed out of Thalasserry, Kulathuvayal was affiliated to it.

The parish spreads through the panchayats of Koothali, Chakkittapara, Koorachundu, Perambra and Kayanna in Kozhikode district. The land is made wet and fertile by the reservoir of the Kuttiady irrigation scheme, and the Chembrapuzha that springs from Chakkittapara, flows east until it reaches Koorachundu, and then turns west and flows around Kulathuvayal till it reaches Kuttiadypuzha. There are about two hundred fifty (250) families in the parish who are mostly agricultural families.

St. George's High School Kulathuvayal
St. George's Higher Secondary School Kulathuvayal situates in a remote hilly area of Calicut district of Kerala state. The school was established in 1941 as an elementary school and was recognized by the government of Madras. Later it was undertaken by the Calicut Diocese and Msgr. C.J. Varkey was appointed as the first Manager of the school and was permanently recognized by the government of Kerala as per proceedings of no R/Dis/No/211/66 dated 10/03/1966 of the DEO Vatakara.

The prime aim of this educational institution was to provide free quality education to the poor and needy, especially the people belonging to Christian community which is included in minority list. The School was upgraded as Higher Secondary School in the year 2000 considering its meritorious service to the community. It is the only high school in the Chakkittapara Grama Panchayat. Around 18000 thousand students have completed the course successfully from this school so far and many of them are in high position in the society.

Syro-Malabar religious houses In Kulathuvayal

1. Missionary Sisters of Mary Immaculate (MSMI) Generalate Kulathuvayal
The Congregation of the Missionary Sisters of Mary Immaculate (MSMI) was started by Fr. C.J. Varkey also known as "Varkeyachan" in 1962. At present, it has 800 professed sisters working in one hundred communities in India, the US, Germany and Italy, engaged with different apostolic activities like teaching, nursing, orphanage, leprosy center, old age homes, family apostolate, social work, pastoral care, prayer and counseling.

In 1951 the region was an underdeveloped hill area with no roads, schools or churches. Most Christians in Malabar are migrants. Migration began during the economic Depression of the 1930s and continued for decades. He started the first school in Kulathuvayal in 1954 and encouraged other parishes in the diocese to open schools before building churches. In 1976, Monsignor Varkey started the Malabar region's first charismatic retreat center that now attracts thousands of people. He died on 24 June 2009 at the age of 88.

2. Sacred Heart (S.H) Convent Kulathuvayal

Kulathuvayal forane 
The King Church Muthukad (1999)
Fathima Matha Church Peruvannamuzhy (1964)
St. Antony's Church Chakkittapara (1993)
St. George Shrine Pilgrim Centre Kulathuvayal (1941)
St. Francis of Assisi Church Perambra (1999)
St Joseph's Church karikadanpara (2007) 
St. Alphonsa Church Narinada (2014)
St. Thomas Church Koorachudu (1950) 
St. Mary's Church Kallanode (1947)
St. Joseph's Church Pathipara (2007) 
St. Mary's Church Kattullamala (1966)
St. Joseph's Church Kariyathumpara (1985)
St. Sebastian's Church Kakkayam (1995)
St. George's Church Thalayad (1968)
Holy Family  Church Kattipara (1950)
St. George's Church Chamal (1973)

Former vicars
Rev. Fr. Joseph Peediyeckal (1941-1944)
Rev. Fr. Thomas Ayillor (1944-1949)
Rev. Fr. Miranda (1949-1951)
Mgr. C.J. Varkey (1951-1967)
Mgr. Francis Arupara (1967-1969)
Rev. Fr. Mathew Kottukapalli (1969-1974)
Rev. Fr. Kuriakose Chemplani (1974-1978)
Rev.Fr. Mathew Panachipuram (1978-1981)
Rev. Fr. Joseph Kuttarapalli (1981-1984)
Mgr. Sebastian Kanjirakattukunnel (1984-1989)
Rev. Fr. Thomas Kochuparambil (1989-1990)
Rev. Fr. Jacob Puthanpura (1990-1993)
Rev. Fr. Ephrem Pottanani (1993-1996)
Rev. Fr. Joseph Arakaparambil (1996-2002)
Rev. Fr. Francis Kallikattu (2002-2007)
Mgr. Mathew Choorapoykayil (2007-2009)
Rev. Fr. George Karukamalil (2009-2013)
Rev. Fr. Sebastian Purayidathil (2013-2015)
Rev. Fr. Thomas Chakkittamuriyil (2015-2017)
Rev. Fr. Sebastian  Pulickal (2017-2019)
Rev. Fr. Roy Koonanickal (2019-2020)
Rev. Fr. George Kalappurackal (2020-)(Current)

Priests from the parish
 Fr. Philip Kanakkacherry
 Fr. Thomas Oswald Kappukattil CMI
 Fr. Jose Kappukattil CMI
 Fr. Michael Karimattom
 Fr. Sebastian Embrayil
 Fr. Thomas Vattottutharappel
 Fr. George Moolayil
 Fr. Sebastian Panamattomparambil
 Fr. Kurian Kumbolil
 Fr. Sebastian Pookulath
 Fr. James Kumbukkal
 Fr. Agustin Pattaniyil
 Fr. Varkey Cheruppillattu
 Fr. Alex kattakkayam
 Fr. Joy Ullattil
 Fr. Reji Kanjirathamkunnel
 Fr. Bino Nadakkal

References 

Churches in Kozhikode district
Syro-Malabar Catholic church buildings
Eastern Catholic churches in Kerala
Roman Catholic churches completed in 1941
20th-century Roman Catholic church buildings in India